Skulpturen Park Köln (Cologne Sculpture Park) is a major international overview of contemporary sculpture which has been on display to the public, in a series of two-year exhibitions, in Cologne, Germany, since 1997.

History 
The  public park features works by German and international artists. It is described as a "place for the exploration of contemporary sculpture". There is no permanent collection but instead, every two years, some of the exhibits are replaced. The garden is operated privately in cooperation with the City of Cologne.

The park was initiated by Cologne art collector Dr. Michael Stoffel, who founded the Society of Friends of Cologne Sculpture Park. Following the death of Stoffel in 2005, his wife, Eleonore, took over as Director until her death in April 2007. On the initiative of the Michael and Eleonore Stoffel Foundation (MES) the Foundation Cologne Sculpture Park was established in 2008 and has now taken over the management of the park. It is thanks to the board of the MES, that the sculptures in the park are on permanent loan from the Pinakothek der Moderne in Munich.

In 1997 the park, with mature trees, already existed as a derelict green space in front of Cologne Zoo, between Zoobrücke and the Rhine. Its conversion to a sculpture park saw the site as a new development on Riehler Strasse, diagonally across from the Zoo. The park has a second entrance from Konrad-Adenauer-Ufer. There are car parking spaces located under the zoo bridge and the park lounge offers drinks and snacks to visitors.

The park is open daily (April - September: 10.30 - 19.00; October - March: 10.30 - 17.00) and admission is free. On the first Sunday of the month at 15.00, a guided tour is available for a small fee. There is an innovative Mobile Art Guide available via smartphone with exhibit labels coded accordingly.

Exhibitions

Exhibits
This park has presented contemporary sculptures by internationally established artists, in a series of two year exhibitions, since 1997.

Sources
A catalogue was published, by the "Gesellschaft der Freunde des Skulpturenparks Köln e.V.", for:
 KölnSkulptur 1, Published by Wienand Verlag, Cologne
 KölnSkulptur 2, Published by Wienand Verlag, Cologne
 KölnSkulptur 3, Published by Wienand Verlag, Cologne
 KölnSkulptur 4, by Verlag der Buchhandlung Walther König, Cologne

External links

skulpturenparkkoeln.de
 

Contemporary art exhibitions
Sculpture gardens, trails and parks in Germany
Museums in Cologne
Contemporary art galleries in Germany
Outdoor sculptures in Germany